"Strangers Again" is a song co-written and recorded by American country music artist Holly Dunn.  It was released in January 1988 as the third single from the album Cornerstone.  The song reached #7 on the Billboard Hot Country Singles & Tracks chart.  The song was written by Dunn and Chris Waters.

Charts

Weekly charts

Year-end charts

References

1988 singles
Holly Dunn songs
Songs written by Chris Waters
Songs written by Holly Dunn
MTM Records singles
Song recordings produced by Tommy West (producer)
1987 songs